Well-known individuals whose surname is or was DeKoven (or De Koven) include:

 Anna de Koven, American novelist, historian and socialite
 Bernie DeKoven (1941-2018), American game designer and author
 Jean de Koven, American dancer
 Lindy DeKoven, American television executive
 James DeKoven, American priest, educator, and a leader of the Oxford Movement in the Episcopal Church
 Reginald De Koven, American music critic and composer
 Seymour DeKoven, classical music radio personality

Other uses
Dekoven, Kentucky